Dave Rezendes (born October 5, 1959) is a former NASCAR driver. He competed in the Busch Series from 1988 until 1994. He joined NASCAR's Craftsman Truck Series in its first season in 1995. Rezendes had his best season in 1996, when he won his only three races and finished sixth in the series points. He stopped racing trucks during the 1998 after the ninth race of the season, and returned to the Busch Series for seven more races for two teams near the end of the season. He has not competed in NASCAR since then.

Motorsports career results

NASCAR
(key) (Bold – Pole position awarded by qualifying time. Italics – Pole position earned by points standings or practice time. * – Most laps led.)

Winston Cup Series

Busch Series

Craftsman Truck Series

References

External links 
 

1959 births
Living people
NASCAR drivers
People from Assonet, Massachusetts
Racing drivers from Massachusetts
American people of Portuguese descent